The Dominican Order (Order of Preachers) has been present in Ireland since 1224 when the first foundation was established in Dublin, a monastic settlement north of the River Liffey, where the Four Courts is located today. This was quickly followed by Drogheda (also 1224), Kilkenny (1225), Waterford (1226), Limerick (1227) and Cork (city) (1229). The order was reestablished in the 19th century after having been driven out in the 17th century by laws against Catholic religious orders. During the Penal Laws, as other Irish Colleges were established on the continent, in 1633 the Irish Dominicans established, the College of Corpo Santo, Lisbon and College of the Holy Cross, Louvain (1624-1797) to train clergy for ministering in Ireland. San Clemente al Laterano in Rome, was entrusted to the Irish Dominicans in 1677. In 1855, St. Mary's Priory, Tallaght, was established to train members of the order, who would complete their clerical studies in Rome and be ordained in the Basilica San Clemente.

Dominican convents, retreat houses, and houses of study

There are currently communities of Dominican friars in the following places in Ireland:

 Convent and seminary in Cork city
 Convent, house of study and retreat house in Tallaght
 Community in Athy
 Others

There are also communities of Dominican nuns in a number of places.

Dominican colleges

Secondary Schools in Ireland 

 Dominican College, Portstewart - a grammar school in Portstewart on the north coast of Ireland
 Dominican College, Fortwilliam - a grammar school for girls in north Belfast
 Dominican College Taylor's Hill - a secondary school for girls in Galway
 Dominican College Sion Hill - a girls' secondary school in Blackrock, County Dublin
 Dominican College Griffith Avenue - a girls' secondary school in Drumcondra, Dublin
 Newbridge College - a private co-education day boarding school in County Kildare
 St. Dominic's College, Cabra - a secondary school for girls in Cabra, Dublin.
 St Dominic's Grammar School for Girls - a grammar school for girls located on the Falls Road, Belfast
 St Rose's Dominican College - this school was established by the Dominicans in Beechmount area, Belfast in 1962.  In 2019, it merged with Christian Brothers School, Glen Road and Corpus Christi College to form All Saints College / Coláiste na Naomh Uile.

Further Education / Houses of Study 
 Dominican Biblical Institute (2000-2015), was a biblical research centre in Limerick, Ireland
 The Priory Institute, Tallaght, Dublin, in what was the Dominican House of Studies until the year 2000, provides degrees and masters programmes by distance learning, validated by the Technological University Dublin
 St. Saviour’s Priory, Dublin since 2000, houses the Studium, the Centre of Institutional Studies of the Irish Dominican friars.
  St. Mary's Dominican Church and Priory, Pope's Quay in Cork is the Novitiate for the Irish Dominican Provice, and they also run courses in theology.

International 
 Dominican Convent High School, Harare, Zimbabwe, founded by an Irish Dominican nun
 Saint Dominic's International School, near Lisbon, Portugal, founded by Irish Dominican sisters

Irish Dominicans outside Ireland
Irish Dominicans have been active outside Ireland, taking up a number of roles and responsibilities. From 1863 many Irish Dominican priests, brothers, and nuns, served the Roman Catholic Archdiocese of Port of Spain, Trinidad and Tobago, as the Irish Dominican Order were given responsibility for the dioceses, with a number serving as Bishops. In 1962 the Irish Dominicans were asked by the Vatican to take over the church mission in Tehran, Iran, building and maintaining  Saint Abraham's Church, Tehran. Irish Dominicans have owned the Basilica of San Clemente and the surrounding building complex since 1667 when Pope Urban VIII gave them refuge, it has become a house of study and residence for Dominicans when studying in Rome. The Irish Dominican College, Louvain, (Collège des Dominicains Irlandais, Louvain), founded in 1659, was also following the French revolution in 1795. Irish Dominican presence in Lisbon goes back to when they sought refuge and clerical training setting up a college, during penal times, a Convent, Convento De Nossa Senhora Do Bom Sucesso, was also established in 1633 which closed in 2006. Today the order maintains one friar in Lisbon who serves the Irish and the English speaking communities there, the convents mission continues under Fundação Obra Social das Religiosas Dominicanas Irlandesas, (FOSRDI).

Notable Irish Dominicans
 Jofroi of Waterford, fl 1300?, scribe, translator
 Edmund Bourke, (d. 1738), author
 Thomas Burke, (1709 - 25 September 1776), Bishop of Ossory
 Damian Louis Byrne OP (1929-1996), 83rd, Master of the Order (1983-1992), second Irishman to hold the post.
 Thomas Nicholas Burke, (8 September 1830 - 2 July 1882), preacher
 Aengus Buckley, (1913–78).  art teacher and artist (painting)
 James Joseph Carbery, (1 May 1823 - 17 December 1887), Bishop of Hamilton, Canada
 Richard Luke Concanen, consecrated as the first Bishop of New York
 Bishop John Connolly, second Bishop of New York (1814-1825)
 Anthony Dominic Fahy, (11 January 1805 - 20 February 1871), missionary in Argentina
 Henry Flanagan, (1918–92), teacher, musician, artist and sculptor
 Edmund Ffrench OP, Bishop of Kilmacduagh and Kilfenora
 Andrew Fitzgerald OP, President of St. Patrick's, Carlow College (1814–1843), and Tithe War campaigner
 Wilfrid Harrington, (b. 1927), theologian
 Roche MacGeoghegan,  (1580 - 26 May 1644), Bishop of Kildare
 Brian McKevitt, publisher of Alive!, a conservative Catholic newspaper
 Michael Peter MacMahon OP, Bishop of Killaloe
 Fr. Joseph Mullooly, (1812 - 1880), archaeologist, superior Irish Dominican College, Rome
 Ambrose O'Conor, MTh, Provincial of the Irish Dominicans, nominated as Vicar Apostolic of Ardagh 1709, died 1711.
 Daniel O'Daly, (1595 - 30 June 1662), diplomat and historian, first rector of Dominican Corpo Santo College, Lisbon
 Geraldine Smyth OP, Prioress International Dominican sisters (1998-2004), Director of the Irish School of Ecumenics(1994-1999)
 John Thomas Troy, (10 May 1739 - 11 May 1823), Archbishop of Dublin

Irish Dominican Bishops Port of Spain
 Patrick Vincent Flood, O.P., Archbishop of Port of Spain (1889–1907)
 John Pius Dowling, O.P., Archbishop of Port of Spain (1909–1940)
 Patrick Finbar Ryan, O.P., Archbishop of Port of Spain (1940–1966), provincial of the Irish Dominican Province (1921–26 and 1930–34)
 William Dominic O'Carroll, O.P. (1874-1880), Coadjutor bishop
 Thomas Raymond Hyland, O.P. (1882-1884), Coadjutor bishop
 George Vincent King, O.P.  1885–1886), Coadjutor bishop
 William Michael Fitzgerald, O.P. (1958-1968), Auxiliary bishop

Irish Dominicans Killed/Martyred
 Richard Barry, O.P., Prior of Cashel, slain there, 1647.
 Dominic Dillon, O.P., prior at Urlar(Sligo), martyred, drogheda 1649
 Raymund Keogh, O.P., Roscommon Priory, martyred mulingar, 1642.
 William Lynch, O.P., hanged, 1649.
 Miler MacGrath (Father Michael of the Rosary), O.P., hanged, Clonmel, 1650.
 William McGillacunny (MacGiolla Coinigh), O.P., executed at Coleraine, 1617.
 Thaddeaus Moriarity, O.P., DTh., Prior of Tralee, hanged, at Killarney, l653.
 Edmund O’Bern, O.P., beheaded after torture, Jamestown, Carrick-on-Shannon, 1652.
 Terence Albert O'Brien, (1600 - 31 Oct 1651), Bishop of Emly, martyr, hanged in Limerick.
 Felix O'Connor, O.P., Prior at Louvain and Sligo; died in Sligo Jail, 1679. 
 William O'Connor, O.P., Clonmel Priory, slain, 1651.
 Thomas O'Higgins, O.P., hanged in Clonmel, 1651. 
 Peter O'Higgins, O.P., Prior of Naas, hanged, 1641.
 John O’Luin, O.P., hanged at Derry 1607.
 Donagh (William) O’Luin, O.P., prior of Derry, hanged and quartered, 1608. 
 Raymund O'Moore, O.P., Martyred, Dublin 1665.
 Richard Oveton, O.P., sub-prior at Athy, beheaded in Drogheda, 1649
 James O’Reilly, O.P., killed near Clonmel, 1649

Provincial of the Dominicans in Ireland
 2021–Present: John Harris O.P.
 2012-2020: Gregory Carroll O.P. 
 2004-2012: Pat Lucey, O.P.
 2000-2004: Gearóid Manning O.P.
 1992-2000: Larry Collins O.P.
 1984-1992: Tom Jordan O.P.
 1969-?: Flannan Aidan Hynes O.P.
 Louis Coffey O.P.
 1957-1961: Reginald Harrington O.P.
 Thomas E. Garde O.P.
 1930-1934: Patrick Finbar Ryan O.P.
 1921-1926: Patrick Finbar Ryan O.P.
 1868-1872: Robert Augustine Concanen White O.P. 
 1864-1868: Bartholomew Thomas Russell O.P. 
 1856-1860: Robert Augustine Concanen White O.P. 
 1852-1856: Bartholomew Thomas Russell O.P. 
 Bernard Dominic Goodman O.P.
 1836-1840: William Joseph McDonnell O.P.
 1832-1836: Peter Dominick Smyth O.P.
 1828-1832: Andrew Fitzgerald O.P.
 Patrick Gibbins O.P.
 1722-1739: John Fottrell O.P.
 Ambrose O'Conor O.P., MTh
 1647: Terence Albert O’Brien O.P.
 1614-1617: Roche MacGeoghegan O.P.
 1593-1600: Thaddeus Duane O.P.

Dominican Publications
Established in 1897, Dominican publications have published Catholic ethos books and a number of magazines and journals.

Journals
 Doctrine and Life (ten times a year)
 Scripture in Church (quarterly)
 Spirituality (every two months)

Former Journals
 Irish Rosary, monthly journal (1897-1961)
 Imeldist, children's publication founded in 1921 published until 1941.

See also

Category:
 Dominican monasteries in the Republic of Ireland
Pages:
 List of abbeys and priories in Ireland
 List of abbeys and priories in Northern Ireland
 List of Catholic religious institutes
 Roman Catholicism in Ireland

External links

National
 Provincial site
 Vocations Website
 Vocations Blog
 Dominican Students' Preaching Website - Dominicans Interactive
 Dominican Publications Website
 Website of the St Martin Apostolate
 Website of the Rosary Apostolate
 Dominican Polish Chaplaincy in Ireland
 Preaching Website
 Dominican Biblical Institute
 Priory Institute

Local communities and apostolates
 Dublin Dominicans' Website
 Tallaght Dominicans' Website
 Kilkenny Dominicans' Website - "The Black Abbey"
 Galway Dominicans' Website
 Tralee Dominicans' Website
 Newbridge Dominicans' Website
 Dominican Polish Chaplaincy in Tralee
 Dominican Polish Chaplaincy in Galway
 Dominican Polish Chaplaincy in Tallaght
 Dominican Retreat Centre in Cork
 Cork City Centre Dominicans' Website
 Waterford City Centre Dominicans' Website
 Dominican Retreat Centre in Tallaght
 San Clemente, the Irish Dominican community in Rome, Italy
 Tehran House of the Irish Dominicans

References

1224 establishments in Ireland
Dominican Order
Catholic Church in Ireland